S. N. Subba Rao (7 February 1929 – 27 October 2021) was a fellow of the Gandhi Peace Foundation and founder of National Youth Project.

Early life

Salem Nanjundaiah Subba Rao was born in Bangalore, Karnataka, on 7 February 1929. He attended the Ramakrishna Vedanta College in Malleshwaram. He was arrested when aged 13 for daubing slogans in support of the Quit India movement.

Activism
In 1969, he became director of the "Gandhi Darshan Train", which toured the country for a year with materials relating to celebrations of the birth centenary of Gandhi.

Subba Rao set up the Mahatma Gandhi Sewa Ashram in the Chambal valley of the Indian state of Madhya Pradesh to rehabilitate dacoits that infested the region. By his calculations, as many as 654 dacoits, many of them contemporaries of Man Singh, surrendered to him between 1960 to 1976.

Awards and Honours
National Youth Award to National Youth Project- 1995
D.Lit. Honoured Degree by Kashi Vidhya Peeth- 1995
Bhartiya Ekta Puruskar
Vishva Manvadhikar Protsahan Puruskar-2002
Rajiv Gandhi National Sadbhavana Award-2003
Rashtirya Sampradayik Sadbhavna Puruskar-2003
Jamanalal Bajaj Puraskar-2006
Mahatma Gandhi Purskar-2008
Anuvart Ahimsa Award-2010
Life Time Achievement Award-2014 by Bharitya Sathi Sangthan Delhi
Mahatma Gandhi Prerna Seva Puraskar-2014 by Karnataka Government
Rashtriya Sadbhawna Ekta Prusaskar-2014 Nagpur,Maharashtra

References

External links 

https://web.archive.org/web/20120826123712/http://nypindia.org/ourdirector.html

1929 births
2021 deaths
Social workers from Karnataka
Social workers
Scholars from Bangalore